Wybieralski is a Polish surname. Notable people with the surname include:

 Jerzy Wybieralski (born 1954), Polish field hockey player
 Józef Wybieralski (born 1946), Polish field hockey player
 Krzysztof Wybieralski (born 1972), Polish field hockey player
 Łukasz Wybieralski, Polish field hockey player

Polish-language surnames